Codrin Ștefănescu (born 20 December 1968) is a Romanian politician, former deputy between 2000 and 2004, and the founder and incumbent general secretary of the Alliance for the Homeland (ApP).

Studies and professional career 
According to the CV published on the website of the Chamber of Deputies, Ștefănescu is a graduate of the Faculty of Informatics and the Faculty of International Economic Relations; universities and study cycles are not specified.

Between 1990 and 1993, Ștefănescu was attached to Europress in Bucharest, editor of culture and art history. In 1993, he founded the Young Romania Foundation, of which he was president from 1996 to 2002. After graduating, he worked as an economist at Coryllus Trading. In an interview for DCNews, Ștefănescu stated that after completing his studies he opened a brokerage firm together with several colleagues from the university, which he later sold to a consortium of banks.

Political career 
Between 2000 and 2004, Ștefănescu was a deputy in the Parliament of Romania, elected on Greater Romania Party (PRM) lists. He was a member of the Committee on the Investigation of Abuse, Corruption and Petitions. One year after taking office, Ștefănescu was expelled from the PRM, in the context in which, together with other party colleagues, he revealed a series of compromising information about Corneliu Vadim Tudor, leader of the party. In June 2001, he joined the Social Democratic Party (PSD). He later left the party and joined the Conservative Party (PC) in 2006. In 2009, he returned to the PRM, where he was appointed president of the PRM Bucharest branch. In 2011, he resigned from the PRM and from all the positions he previously held within the party.

Ștefănescu rejoined the PSD in 2011, and he held the position of general secretary of PSD Bucharest. Consecutively, he was appointed deputy general secretary of the party, a position he held until 2018 when it was abolished. Also in 2018, he ran for the position of general secretary of the party but lost to Marian Neacșu with 668 votes for and 3,063 against.

In September 2021, Liviu Dragnea revealed and announced that he supports a new political party, called the Alliance for the Homeland (APP), headed by Ștefănescu. According to Dragnea, the initiation of the party was Codrin's idea that the two would have talked about such an organization since October 2020 (most likely).

Legislative proposals 
Ștefănescu is the initiator of Law no. 15/2003, also known as the Youth Law, and other 20 legislative proposals.

Published books 
 1994: Fals și original – prelegeri din istoria artei (co-author)
 1995: Războiul celor de sus
 1996: Vectorul corupție
 2002: Analiza factorială a fenomenelor social-economice în profil regional (co-author)
 2005: Țăranul român în vechi cărți poștale ilustrate (co-author)
 2006: Familia regală în vechi cărți poștale (co-author)

Personal life 
Between 1998 and 2010, Ștefănescu had a relationship with Luiza Tănase, from which a girl, Andra, was born. Ștefănescu also has a son from the relationship with the model Alice Constantinică.

References 

1968 births
21st-century Romanian politicians
Greater Romania Party politicians
Leaders of political parties in Romania
Living people
Members of the Chamber of Deputies (Romania)
Romanian numismatists
Romanian philatelists
Social Democratic Party (Romania) politicians